The Hon John Cunninghame, Lord Cunninghame (1782–1854) was a 19th-century Scottish lawyer who rose to be both Solicitor General of Scotland and a Senator of the College of Justice.

Life

He was born in 1782 the eldest son of John Cunninghame. He is thought to have studied law at the University of Edinburgh.

In 1805 he is listed as John Cunningham Writer to the Signet operating from 5 George Street in Edinburgh.

In 1810 he was operating as an advocate from 20 Queen Street. The building still survives.

In 1835 he succeeded Duncan McNeill as Solicitor General for Scotland. He then lived at 80 Great King Street in Edinburgh's Second New Town.

In 1837 he succeeded David Williamson, Lord Balgray as a Senator of the College of Justice. His position as Solicitor General was filled by Andrew Rutherfurd, Lord Rutherfurd.

He died in 1854.

Family

He was married to Margaret Richard Fisher Trotter, daughter of Lt General Alexander Trotter and sister of Richard Trotter of Mortonhall.

Artistic recognition
In early life he was portrayed by John Kay.

His portrait in the role of Solicitor General of Scotland was made in 1836 and is held in the Scottish National Portrait Gallery.

References

1782 births
1854 deaths
Alumni of the University of Edinburgh
19th-century Scottish judges
Senators of the College of Justice